ARC San Andres may refer to the following ships of the Colombian Navy:

 ARC San Andres (BO 151), a survey ship in the Colombian Navy, formerly the USS Rockville, a PCE-842-class patrol vessel in the US Navy
 ARC San Andres (BO 154), a survey ship commissioned to replace San Andres (BO 151)
 ARC San Andres (PO-45), a buoy-tender in the Colombian Navy, formerly the USCGC Gentian (WLB-290)

Ship names
Set index articles on ships